Zeigler Coal Company was a coal mining company founded by Joseph Leiter along with its company town of Zeigler, Illinois in 1903.

It was controlled by the Zeigler Coal Holding Company, which, in 1998, was purchased by AEI Resources. The company produced steam-grade coal, which it primarily sold to electric utilities.

Railroad Operations 
The company had registered a reporting mark, ZCCX, with the AAR. At least one piece of rolling stock, originally their NW2 switcher #2-22, remains in full Zeigler Coal Company Paint.

Notes

Coal companies of the United States
Defunct companies based in Illinois
Defunct Illinois railroads
Coal in Illinois